Lucas Mauragis (born 4 September 2001) is an Australian professional soccer player who plays as a full back for Wellington Phoenix on loan from Newcastle Jets.

Club career

Newcastle Jets

Mauragis trialled with Newcastle Jets Youth in 2019 where he impressed coach Daniel McBreen who rewarded him with a contract in the youth team. The 2019-20 A-League season resumed in July 2020, on 13 October 2020 Mauragis was called up to the first team as he made his professional debut for Newcastle in a 3-0 win against Wellington Phoenix.

In the 2020-21 A-League season Mauragis started the opening two matches for Newcastle as he competed with Connor O'Toole for the starting position at left-back. After appearing regularly for the Jets in the early stages of the season he was subsequently not included in the matchday squad until the later stages of the season. Mauragis started in the teams remaining three matches of the regular season where he scored one goal and made two assists as his combination with fellow youth team player Archie Goodwin resulted in Newcastle avoiding finishing last on the table.

International career
Mauragis received his first competitive international call-up in October 2021, for the Australian under-23 team, to play in 2022 AFC U-23 Asian Cup qualification games against Indonesia in Tajikistan.

Career statistics

References

External links

2001 births
Living people
Australian soccer players
Association football midfielders
Newcastle Jets FC players
National Premier Leagues players
A-League Men players
Australian people of Lithuanian descent